Edward Stawiarz (born 16 June 1940) is a Polish long-distance runner. He competed in the marathon at the 1972 Summer Olympics.

References

1940 births
Living people
Athletes (track and field) at the 1968 Summer Olympics
Athletes (track and field) at the 1972 Summer Olympics
Polish male long-distance runners
Polish male marathon runners
Olympic athletes of Poland
Sportspeople from Kraków